The table tennis competitions at the 2013 Mediterranean Games in Mersin took place between 25 June and 29 June at the CNR Mersin Yenişehir Exhibition Centre Hall A.

Athletes competed in 2 individual and 2 team events.

Medal table

Medal summary

Medalists

References

Sports at the 2013 Mediterranean Games
2013
2013 in table tennis